The 2020 Toyota U.S. Open Swimming Championships were contested from November 12 to 14, 2020 in a virtual competition format at nine locations in the United States with medalists determined from the merged results across all nine locations. Competition was conducted in long course (50 meter) pools.

Venues
Due to the COVID-19 pandemic, the format of the Championships was changed from its normal one in-person venue competition format to a virtual format, marking the first USA Swimming Championships contested in a virtual format and the second USA Swimming competition of any type, Championships or non-Championships, in a virtual format. Individual sites of competition included the following nine venues (cities):
 Blossom Athletic Center (San Antonio, Texas).
 Greensboro Aquatic Center (Greensboro, North Carolina).
 Huntsville Aquatic Center (Huntsville, Alabama).
 Indiana University Natatorium (Indianapolis, Indiana).
 Selby Aquatic Center (Sarasota, Florida).
 SwimRVA (Richmond, Virginia).
 Tualatin Hills Aquatic Center (Beaverton, Oregon).
 Wellmark YMCA (Des Moines, Iowa).
 William Woollett Jr. Aquatics Center (Irvine, California).

Results

Men

Women

Championships records set

References

External links
 Results book

Swimming competitions in the United States
2020 in swimming
November 2020 sports events in the United States